Chilappol Penkutty is an Indian Malayalam-language film directed by Prasad Nooranad and written by M Kamaruddin. The film is produced by Suneesh Samuel under the banner of True Movie Makers. The movie stars Krishnachandran, Sunil Sukhada, Aristo Suresh, Suneesh Samuel, Avani S Prasad and Kavya Ganesh in the lead roles.

Cast

Suneesh Samuel
Avani S Prasad 
Kavya Ganesh as Vandana 
Samreen Rathish
Krishnachandran
Sunil Sukhada
V. Suresh Thampanoor
Lakshmi Prasad
Naushad
Parvathi
Sivamurali
Sharath
Akhil Raj Mollyland
Rudra S Lal as Lakshmi
Dileep Shanker
Priya Rajeev as Bindu
Shruthi Rajanikanth
Bhagyalakshmi
Jayalal

Plot
The movie discusses the atrocities committed towards women and its consequences in the light of Kathua rape case where an eight-year-old girl was raped and murdered. The film portrays the feeling of the victims when such an incident is being discussed on social media. The film also shows, how the victim is getting help from one of her friends.

Soundtrack

The soundtrack for Chilappol Penkutty was composed by Ajay Sarigama. The soundtrack of the film was released by Kadakampally Surendran, Minister of Tourism, Kerala by handing over the audio CD to East Coast Vijayan at a launch event at Thiruvananthapuram on 30, July 2018.

References

2010s Malayalam-language films